The  was a road across Kyūshū from Chikushino to Kagoshima, used by daimyōs for the sankin-kōtai, and also by the lord of the Satsuma han on whom a similar obligation of visiting the shōgun was imposed.

The Satsuma Kaidō's route is followed closely by the modern Route 3.

Subroutes

In addition to the established use of traveling from Edo (modern-day Tokyo) to Satsuma Province, there were also many roads that connected from the Satsuma Kaidō. One such sub-route was the Ōkuchisuji (大口筋), which connected Satsuma Province with Ōkuchi. The terminus for the Ōkuchisuji is in Ōkuchi in modern Isa. Another sub-route was the Takaokasuji (高岡筋) connected Kajiki (modern-day Aira) with the Sadowara Castle in Sadowara (modern-day Miyazaki), Miyazaki Prefecture. Part of its route can be traced with Japan's Route 10.

Stations of the Satsuma Kaidō
The Satsuma Kaidō's 23 post stations are listed below with their modern-day municipalities indicated beside them.

Fukuoka Prefecture
Starting Location: Yamae-shuku (山家宿) (Chikushino)  (also part of the Nagasaki Kaidō)
1. Matsuzaki-shuku (松崎宿) (Ogōri)
2. Fuchu-shuku (府中宿) (Kurume)
3. Hainuzuka-shuku (羽犬塚宿) (Chikugo)
4. Setaka-shuku (瀬高宿) (Miyama)
5. Haramachi-shuku (原町宿) (Miyama)

Kumamoto Prefecture
6. Nankan-shuku (南関宿) (Nankan, Tamana District)
7. Yamaga-shuku (山鹿宿) (Yamaga)
8. Mitorishinmachi-shuku (味取新町宿) (Kumamoto)
9. Kumamoto-shuku (熊本宿) (Kumamoto)
10. Kawashiri-shuku (河尻宿) (Kumamoto)
11. Uto-shuku (宇土宿) (Uto)
12. Ogawa-shuku (小川宿) (Uki)
13. Yatsushiro-shuku (八代宿) (Yatsushiro)
14. Hinagu-shuku (日奈久宿) (Yatsushiro)
15. Sashiki-shuku (佐敷宿) (Ashikita, Ashikita District)
16. Chinmachi-shuku (陳町宿) (Minamata)

Kagoshima Prefecture
17. Izumi-shuku (出水宿) (Izumi)
18. Akune-shuku (阿久根宿) (Akune)
19. Mukōda-shuku (向田宿) (Satsumasendai)
20. Kushikino-shuku (串木野宿) (Ichikikushikino)
21. Ichiki-shuku (市来宿) (Ichikikushikino)
22. Ijūin-shuku (伊集院宿) (Hioki)
23. Kagoshima-shuku (鹿児島宿) (Kagoshima)
Ending Location: Kagoshima Castle (Kagoshima)

See also

Kaidō
Edo Five Routes

References

Road transport in Japan